Natrampalli is a selection grade panchayat town and Taluk in Tirupattur district in the Indian state of Tamil Nadu. The Natrampalli block is a revenue block in the Tirupattur district of Tamil Nadu, India.

Demographics
 India census, Natrampalli had a population of 9076. Males constitute 49% of the population and females 51%. Natrampalli has an average literacy rate of 71%, higher than the national average of 59.5%: male literacy is 77%, and female literacy is 64%. In Natrampalli, 12% of the population is under 6 years of age.

Politics
 State assembly constituency (Jolarpettai).
 Natrampalli assembly constituency is part of Tiruvannamalai (Lok Sabha constituency).

References

Cities and towns in Vellore district